The Universitario de Campeche is a multi-use stadium in Campeche City.  It is currently used mostly for football matches and is the home stadium for Corsarios de Campeche  The stadium has a capacity of 4,000 people.

References

Football venues in Mexico
Athletics (track and field) venues in Mexico
Sports venues in Campeche